Hendrik Anthony "Hans" Kramers (17 December 1894 – 24 April 1952) was a Dutch physicist who worked with Niels Bohr to understand how electromagnetic waves interact with matter and made important contributions to quantum mechanics and statistical physics.

Background and education
Hans Kramers was born on 17 December 1894 in Rotterdam. the son of Hendrik Kramers, a physician, and Jeanne Susanne Breukelman.

In 1912 Hans finished secondary education (HBS) in Rotterdam, and studied mathematics and physics at the University of Leiden, where he obtained a master's degree in 1916. Kramers wanted to obtain foreign experience during his doctoral research, but his first choice of supervisor, Max Born in Göttingen, was not reachable because of the First World War. Because Denmark was neutral in this war, as was the Netherlands, he travelled (by ship, overland was impossible) to Copenhagen, where he  visited unannounced the then still relatively unknown Niels Bohr. Bohr took him on as a Ph.D. candidate and Kramers prepared his dissertation under Bohr's direction. Although Kramers did most of his doctoral research (on intensities of atomic transitions) in Copenhagen, he obtained his formal Ph.D. under Ehrenfest in Leiden, on 8 May 1919.

Kramers enjoyed music, and played cello and piano.

Academic career
He worked for almost ten years in Bohr's group, becoming an associate professor at the University of Copenhagen. He played a role in the ill-fated BKS theory of 1924-5 BKS theory. Kramers left Denmark in 1926 and returned to the Netherlands. He became a full professor in theoretical physics at Utrecht University, where he supervised Tjalling Koopmans. In 1934 he left Utrecht and succeeded Paul Ehrenfest in Leiden. From 1931 until his death he held also a cross appointment at Delft University of Technology.

Kramers was one of the founders of the Mathematisch Centrum in Amsterdam.

In 1925, with Werner Heisenberg he developed the Kramers–Heisenberg dispersion formula. He is also credited with introducing in 1948 the concept of renormalization into quantum field theory, although his approach was nonrelativistic. He is also credited for the Kramers–Kronig relations with Ralph Kronig which are mathematical equations relating real and imaginary parts of complex functions constrained by causality. One further refers to a Kramers turnover when the rate of thermally activated barrier crossing as a function of the damping goes through a maximum, thereby undergoing a transition between the energy diffusion and spatial diffusion regimes.  He is also known for Kramers%27_theorem.

Family

On 25 October 1920 he was married to Anna Petersen. They had three daughters and one son.

Recognition
Kramers became member of the Royal Netherlands Academy of Arts and Sciences in 1929, he was forced to resign in 1942. He joined the Academy again in 1945. Kramers won the Lorentz Medal in 1947 and Hughes Medal in 1951.

Notes

See also
Chain reaction
Kramers-Gaunt factor
Spin (physics)
Stark effect

References

External links

 H.B.G. Casimir, Kramers, Hendrik Anthony (1894–1952), in Biografisch Woordenboek van Nederland. (in Dutch)
 J.M. Romein,  Hendrik Anthony Kramers, in: Jaarboek van de Maatschappij der Nederlandse Letterkunde te Leiden, 1951–1953, pp. 83–91. (in Dutch)
 Ph.D. candidates of H.A. Kramers: 1929-1952
 Publications of H.A. Kramers

1894 births
1952 deaths
20th-century Dutch physicists
Quantum physicists
Academic staff of the Delft University of Technology
Leiden University alumni
Members of the Royal Netherlands Academy of Arts and Sciences
Probability theorists
Lorentz Medal winners
Scientists from Rotterdam
Presidents of the International Union of Pure and Applied Physics
Members of the Royal Swedish Academy of Sciences